Saddle River Stringband is the debut album from the band of the same name.

Track listing
Outlaw Blues*
Louis Collins (M.J. Hurt)
Nashville Junky**
Swagger and Sway*
We Shall Rise (A.P. Carter)
Don't Sell it (O. Woods)
County Farm (S. House)
Grenadine*
I Don't Think you Love Me***
So Long Blues**
Some of These Days (C. Patton)
Bye Bye PEI***

 *J. Phillips
 **T. McArthur
 ***M. Dixon

Personnel

Mike Dixon - Guitar, kazoo
James Phillips - Mandolin
Troy McArthur - Banjo, ukulele
Tom Desroches - Double bass
Norm Bowser - Dobro (on track 9)
Produced by Saddle River Stringband
Engineered by Troy McArthur and James Phillips
Mixed by Troy McArthur and James Phillips
Mastered by Paul Milner
Photography and graphic design by Jillian Grady

2007 debut albums
Saddle River String Band albums